Humain, trop humain is a French documentary film by Louis Malle about the operations of a Citroën car production plant.

External links 

1973 films
1970s French-language films
French documentary films
Films directed by Louis Malle
Citroën
1973 documentary films
Films directed by René Vautier
1970s French films